Aspergillus laciniosus (also named Neosartorya laciniosa) is a species of fungus in the genus Aspergillus. It is from the Fumigati section. The species was first described in 2006. It has been reported to produce aszonalenins, tryptoquivaline, and tryptoquivalone.

Growth and morphology

A. laciniosus has been cultivated on both Czapek yeast extract agar (CYA) plates and Malt Extract Agar Oxoid® (MEAOX) plates. The growth morphology of the colonies can be seen in the pictures below.

References 

laciniosus
Fungi described in 2006